Naujamiestis is an eldership in the Vilnius city municipality, Lithuania. It occupies 4.9 km². According to the 2021 census, it had a population of 28,157, giving it a population density of 5,745 people per square kilometer.

Tourist attractions, theatres, and museums

 Lithuanian National Opera and Ballet Theatre
 The Opera and Ballet Theater Fountains
 Opera Park
 Vytautas Kasiulis Art Museum
 Beatričė Grincevičiūtė House Museum
 State Small Theatre of Vilnius
 Lukiškės Square
 Interactive Fountains
 Museum of Occupations and Freedom Fights
 The Green House
 The Venclova house-museum
 Aurochs Mountain
 Marriage Palace Park
 Old Theatre of Vilnius

Transportation
 Vilnius railway station
 European route E272

References

Neighbourhoods of Vilnius